Almost Home (aka On the Move) was an educational television show which was produced and broadcast by TVOntario (known at the time as the Ontario Educational Communications Authority) in 1972 or 1973. The premise of the show is about a young man from Cornwall, Ontario, Ken Matthews, who travels to Manitoba and returns into Ontario, hitchhiking his way home through Northern Ontario and southward. The stories of each episode detail the various people he meets in his travels. The show was also shown in junior high and high schools as a teaching tool.

Actors and actresses
 Michael Duhig as Ken Matthews
 Beth Amos
 Jack Mather
 James Barron
 Mel Tuck
 Syd Brown
 Larry Reynolds
 Les Rubie

Episodes
Nine episodes were broadcast. A tenth was scripted but not filmed. Here are the titles for all ten:

1- "Boots"- Ken meets a shopkeeper who accuses him of stealing a pair of boots.
2- "I'm Looking For Volunteers And You're It"- Ken is conscripted to help battle a forest fire.
3- "Words are Wild Birds"- Ken learns about business from the owners of a roadside service station.
4- "Playing the Angles"- Ken and another hitchhiker get a lift from two bank robbers.
5- "It's My Country and You Better Believe It"- On Manitoulin Island Ken learns about its rich native history.
6- "Just Talk to Us"- Ken witnesses the struggles between an immigrant construction owner and the union.
7- "An Old Man With A Suitcase Full Of Books"- Ken gets a job picking tobacco and meets a drifter who teaches him a valuable lesson.
8- "Remember All the Things We Were Going to Do?"- Ken heads to Niagara Falls to meet an old friend whose life hasn't turned out too well.
9- "Almost Home"- Ken heads back to home to Cornwall when he meets a professional car racer and an architect which make Ken question his own future.
10- "Never the Same Again"- The final program integrates Ken's adventures into a TV movie about his travels and his responsibility to others.

Filming locations
 Kakabeka Falls, Ontario
 Manitoulin Island
 Niagara Falls, Ontario
 Uxbridge, Ontario
 Schomberg, Ontario
 King City, Ontario

External links
 A webpage dedicated to the show as well as other classic TVOntario children's shows of the '70s and '80s
 Internet Movie Database listing

TVO original programming